Rupichloa  is a genus of Brazilian plants in the grass family.

 Species
 Rupichloa acuminata (Renvoize) Salariato & Morrone - Bahia, Minas Gerais
 Rupichloa decidua (Morrone & Zuloaga) Salariato & Morrone - Bahia

References

Panicoideae
Poaceae genera
Endemic flora of Brazil
Grasses of Brazil
Flora of Bahia
Flora of Minas Gerais